Imanol Landeta (born Imanol Goenaga Martí on July 23, 1987), more commonly known simply as Imanol, is a Mexican former singer and actor. His acting career started with the film Última llamada in 1996, and he has appeared in almost a dozen films and television series since. He is the son of actor Manuel Landeta. Imanol Landeta began working as an airplane pilot after retiring from show business.

Discography

2007: Señales
2004: Es Hoy
2002: Si tú supieras
2000: Creciendo juntos
1999: Pescador
1998: Pedacitos de amor
1997: Imanol

Films

2007: 'Surf's Up (Reyes de las Olas) (as the voice of Cody)
2003: Un secreto de Esperanza ("A secret of Hope", released as A Beautiful Secret in the US)
1997: Elisa antes del fin del mundo ("Elisa before the end of the world")
1996: Última llamada'' ("Last Call")

Telenovelas
2009: Verano de amor as Daniel Gurzan
2008: Juro que te amo as Pablo Lazcano
2006: Codigo postal as Pablo
2005: Bajo el mismo techo2003: Velo de novia  as Alexis Robleto
2003: De pocas pocas pulgas  as Rolando Main Antagonist2002: Clase 406  as Alejandro Acero Pineda
1999: El niño que vino del mar  as Felipín Rodríguez Cáceres de Ribera
1998: Vivo por Elena  as Juanito
1997: Los hijos de nadieTelevision shows

2005: Bailando Por Un Sueño1993: Plaza Sésamo  (Spanish-language version of Sesame Street)
1992: ChiquilladasTheater

1996: Marcelino Pan y Vino1989: Qué plantón'''

References

 
 

1987 births
Mexican child singers
Living people
Mexican male child actors
Mexican male film actors
Mexican male telenovela actors
Mexican people of Basque descent
Male actors from Mexico City
Singers from Mexico City
21st-century Mexican singers
21st-century Mexican male singers